The Schader Award is a German award bestowed annually on a social scientist. It is awarded by the Schader foundation of Darmstadt. The foundation and its award are founded by and named for Alois M. Schader, and comes with a 15,000 Euro prize.

Past winners

 1993: three winners in the field of city planning
 1994: five winners on the theme of age, including Leopold Rosenmayr
 1995: six winners on the theme of migration
 1996: six winners on the theme of traffic
 1997: five winners on the theme of labor and joblessness, including Burkart Lutz
 1998: no prize awarded
 1999: Renate Mayntz
 2000: Meinhard Miegel
 2001: Peter Graf Kielmansegg
 2002: Fritz W. Scharpf
 2003: Hartmut Häußermann and Walter Siebel
 2004: Bernd Raffelhüschen
 2005: Ulrich Beck
 2006: Gesine Schwan
 2007: Franz-Xaver Kaufmann
 2008: Klaus von Beyme
 2009: Ralf Dahrendorf
 2010: Wolf Lepenies
 2011: Jan Philipp Reemtsma
 2012: Paul Kirchhoff
 2013: Jutta Allmendinger
 2014: Stephan Leibfried
 2015: Angelika Nußberger
 2016: Christine Landfried
 2017: :de:Nicole Deitelhoff
 2018: Otfried Jarren
 2019: Christoph Möllers
 2020: Dorothea Kübler

See also

 List of social sciences awards

References

Bibliography
 Tobias Robischon (ed.): Schaderpreis 1997: Burkart Lutz. Schader-Stiftung, Darmstadt 1998. 
 Tobias Robischon (ed.): Forschungsprojekt Umzugswünsche und Umzugsmöglichkeiten älterer Menschen: Handlungsperspektiven für Wohnungspolitik, Wohnungswirtschaft und Dienstleistungsanbieter; Tagungsdokumentation mit Stellungnahmen aus der Praxis. Schader-Stiftung, Darmstadt 1997.

External links
 Der Schader-Preis auf der Website der Schader-Stiftung

German science and technology awards
Social sciences awards